Vivek Vedagiri (born 9 September 1981) is a Singaporean cricketer. He made his List A debut in the 2006 ACC Trophy and was a member of the Singaporean cricket team at the 2009 ICC World Cricket League Division Six tournament.

Vedagiri was a member of the national team which won the gold medal in the men's T20 cricket tournament and was also part of the national side which won the silver medal in the men's 50-over tournament after an embarrassing defeat with a margin of 251 runs in the finals against Malaysia.

References

External links 
 
 Singaporean cricketers list

1981 births
Living people
Singaporean cricketers
Southeast Asian Games gold medalists for Singapore
Southeast Asian Games silver medalists for Singapore
Southeast Asian Games medalists in cricket
Competitors at the 2017 Southeast Asian Games
Wicket-keepers